Kenneth John McNaught (22 April 1913 – 17 May 1999) was a New Zealand philatelist who was added to the Roll of Distinguished Philatelists in 1978.

In the 1995 New Year Honours, he was appointed a Companion of the Queen's Service Order for community service.

McNaught was the Royal Philatelic Society London's special representative for New Zealand.

References

Signatories to the Roll of Distinguished Philatelists
1913 births
1999 deaths
New Zealand philatelists
Fellows of the Royal Philatelic Society London
New Zealand chemists
Companions of the Queen's Service Order